Madiya is a small village situated in the Pool Department (South Region) in the Republic of the Congo. The name of the village were given by an old man who fought for that territory during the colonialism period. It has a small forest called Sangui and a river called Madiya River.

Transport  
Madiya is served by a railway station on the Congo-Ocean Railway.

See also  
Railway stations in Congo 

 
 

Populated places in the Republic of the Congo